The 1979 European Judo Championships were the 29th edition of the European Judo Championships, and were held in Brussels, Belgium on 26 May 1979.

Medal overview

Medal table

References 
 Results of the 1979 European Judo Championships (JudoInside.com)
 Results of the 1979 European Judo Championships (the-sports.org)

E
Judo
European Judo Championships
1970s in Brussels
Sports competitions in Brussels
Judo competitions in Belgium
International sports competitions hosted by Belgium
May 1979 sports events in Europe